The Veidal Prison Camp was established in Kvænangen in August 1942 by the German occupation authorities. The prison camp was a subunit of the Grini Prison Camp and, together with the Badderen Prison Camp, was created to erect snow fences and build snow sheds along a  length of roadway over the mountain Kvænangsfjellet. Four hundred prisoners from the Grini camp were sent to Kvænangsfjellet to assist Norwegian civilian laborers with the construction. The prisoners remained on the mountain for three months, from August 14, 1942 to November 11, 1942.

The construction work for the snow sheds and snow fences was led by Organisation Todt, and the camp was guarded by the Wehrmacht.

The prisoners that were sent from Grini to the Veidal camp to work on the snow sheds included the artist Per Krohg and the architect Odd Nansen. Both of them wrote about their time on Kvænangsfjellet: Per Krohg in Memoarer – minner og meninger (Memoirs: Memories and Opinions; 1966) and Odd Nansen in Fra dag til dag (Day after Day; vol. 2, 1946).

References

External links
 North Troms History Club. Excursion to prisoner of war camps at the mountain Kvænangsfjellet and the isthmus Baddereidet. Photo albums.

World War II prisoner of war camps in Norway
Norway in World War II
Buildings and structures in Troms og Finnmark
Prisons in Norway
History of Troms og Finnmark